The following highways are numbered 993:

United States